Take Me as I Am may refer to:

Albums 
 Take Me as I Am (Faith Hill album), or the title song (see below), 1993
 Take Me as I Am (Ian McCallum album), or the title song, 1997

Songs 
 "Take Me as I Am" (FM Static song), 2009
 "Take Me as I Am" (Faith Hill song), 1993
 "Take Me as I Am" (Mary J. Blige song), 2006
 "Take Me as I Am" (Tornike Kipiani song), 2020
 "Take Me as I Am", by Bob Dylan from Self Portrait
 "Take Me as I Am", by Seven Wiser from Seven Wiser
 "Take Me as I Am", by Vanessa Amorosi from Turn to Me
 "Take Me As I Am", by Wyclef Jean from The Preacher's Son
 "Take Me as I Am", from the Broadway musical Jekyll & Hyde
 "Take Me As I Am", by Example from Live Life Living
 “Take Me As I Am”, by Carly Simon from Come Upstairs
 "Take Me as I Am" by Sharissa
 "Take Me as I Am", by Rina Sawayama from RINA
 "Take Me as I Am", by The Streets from "None of Us Are Getting Out of This Life Alive"